Domenico Caruso (San Martino di Taurianova, 
March 25,1933) is an Italian poet and writer. He is a noted scholar of the Calabrian dialects, the language in which he composed many of his works.

Main works

Calabria mia
La Calabria e il suo poeta
Liriche e satire
Primi abbozzi
Storia della Calabria
Storia e Folklore Calabrese
Martino di Tours

Poetry

'U barveri
A' funtana
A' stada
Calabrisi jeu sugnu e mi 'ndi vantu
Gnuri e pezzenti

Awards

Mondo domani (1963)
Alla ricerca del folk italiano (1972)
Era Lacinia (1973)

References

External links
 Domenico Caruso su Storia e Folklore Calabrese
 Domenico Caruso su Calabresi.net
 Dialettando.com – I racconti della regione Calabria
 CalabriaOnLine – Poesie Calabresi
 Centro Studi Bruttium

1933 births
Italian poets
Italian male poets
People from the Province of Reggio Calabria
Living people